Zelinski or Zelinsky may refer to 
Settlements in Croatia
Biškupec Zelinski
Brezovec Zelinski 
Bukovec Zelinski
Marinovec Zelinski
Obrež Zelinski
Suhodol Zelinski

Other
Zelinski (surname) 
 3042 Zelinsky, an asteroid
 Zelinskiy (crater), a lunar impact crater